The 2016 Asia Cup was held in Bangladesh in the 2015–16 Bangladeshi cricket season. The season was to be featuring a tour of the country by Australia but it has been postponed amid security concerns. Khulna Division won the National Cricket League (NCL) championship title for the fourth time and Comilla Victorians won the revived Bangladesh Premier League (BPL).

Honours
 National Cricket League – Khulna Division
 Bangladesh Premier League – Comilla Victorians
 Most runs – Shahriar Nafees (Barisal) 1,117 @ 62.05
 Most wickets – Abdur Razzak (Khulna) 66 @ 33.71

International cricket

Australia was due to tour Bangladesh from 28 September to 21 October 2015 and playing two Test matches but it has been postponed amid security concerns.

India beat Bangladesh by 8 wickets in the final of the 2016 Asia Cup, held in Bangladesh.

See also
 History of cricket in Bangladesh

Notes

Further reading
 Wisden Cricketers' Almanack 2016

External links
 CricInfo re Bangladesh
 CricketArchive re tournaments in Bangladesh in 2015–16

2015 in Bangladeshi cricket
2016 in Bangladeshi cricket
Bangladeshi cricket seasons from 2000–01
Domestic cricket competitions in 2015–16